This is a survey of the postage stamps and postal history of Grenada.

Grenada is an island country in the British Commonwealth consisting of the island of Grenada and six smaller islands at the southern end of the Grenadines in the southeastern Caribbean Sea. Grenada is located northwest of Trinidad and Tobago, northeast of Venezuela, and southwest of Saint Vincent and the Grenadines.

First stamps

Beginning in 1858, the stamps of Great Britain were used in Grenada. Stamps posted in Grenada can be identified by the A15 oval postmark cancelled at St. George's.

The first stamps of Grenada depicting the portrait of Queen Victoria in the values of 1 penny (green) and 6 pence (rose) were issued on 3 June 1861.

Later issues

The seal of the colony featuring La Concepción with the motto CLARIOR E TENEBRIS (Even clearer in the darkness) was depicted in the 1906 issue and later issues in 1934, 1938, 1951, and 1953.

Independence
Independence was granted on February 7, 1974, and observed with stamps overprinted "Independence. 7th Feb. 1974".

Grenada ranks among countries that have issued the most stamps in the world.

Local issues
Stamps inscribed "Grenada Grenadines" were issued from 1973 to 1999 for the islands of the Grenadines located to the north of Grenada. Since 1999, stamps for the Grenadines are marked "Grenada Carriacou & Petite Martinique".

References

Further reading 
 Bacon, E.D. and F. H. Napier. Grenada: to which is prefixed an account of the perforations of the Perkins Bacon printed stamps of the British colonies. London: Stanley Gibbons, 1902 173p. Series Title: The Stanley Gibbons Philatelic handbooks; no. 7.
 Charlton, Alfred. The Postal History and Postage Stamps of Grenada. Leominster: P.L. Pemberton & Son, Ltd., 1955 51p. Series Title: Studies in philately. New series; 1.
 Proud, Edward B. The Postal History of Barbados and Grenada. Heathfield, East Sussex: Proud-Bailey Co., 2006 ISBN 9781872465425 335p.
Sefi, Alexander J. The Postage Stamps of Grenada. London: D. Field, 1912 39p. Series Title: The "W.E.P." series of philatelic handbooks ; 8.
 Raymond, Gale J. Grenada: Operation Urgent Fury: The Postal History, including the Caribbean Peacekeeping Forces 25 October 1983-7 June 1985. Houston, TX.: "The Catamounts", 1988 44p.
 Walker, Dan. Grenada's Postal History 1764-1913: [reproduction of a postal exhibit 1982]. Redondo Beach, CA.: British Caribbean Philatelic Study Group, 1982 95p.

External links
Identifying the King George VI Stamps of Grenada.

Communications in Grenada
Grenada